Linda Fite is an American writer and editor who wrote the entire run of the Marvel Comics series The Cat (1972).

Biography
Linda Fite was hired by Marvel as an editorial assistant/production assistant. Though she continually appealed to editor Roy Thomas for writing assignments, from 1968–1971 she was given only short back-up features in The Uncanny X-Men and Rawhide Kid. In 1972 she got her first offer to be a regular writer, on Claws of the Cat, an early and unsuccessful attempt to appeal to female superhero comic readers. Fite was selected because Marvel's editorial staff thought a series targeted toward female readers should have a female creative team.

Fite has said that she found the character unappealing: "I thought, 'A cat? Oh, my God, how original. We’ll have a woman and we’ll call her Cat and she can be in catfights.' But I was just happy to have the chance to do it." She infused the series with a woman's liberation tone, but it was cancelled after four issues due to poor sales. She had already completed the never-published fifth issue.

Other stories she wrote included a fill-in issue of Night Nurse. Fite wrote and illustrated a one-page story for an East Coast independent/underground comic published by Flo Steinberg, Big Apple Comix (Sept. 1975).

While serving as an assistant to Marvel editor-in-chief Stan Lee, Fite helped bring fledgling artist Barry Windsor-Smith to the company. After she responded with an encouraging note to art he had sent to the Marvel offices, Smith and a friend, Steve Parkhouse, flew from  England and camped out near the Marvel Comics offices, seeking work.

Fite worked for the Times Herald-Record, a daily newspaper based in Middletown, New York, and she is currently managing editor of the BlueStone Press in Ulster County, New York.

Fite was married to, and then divorced, Marvel Comics artist Herb Trimpe. They had three children together.

References

Living people
American comics writers
Female comics writers
Marvel Comics people
Year of birth missing (living people)